Dorothy Edith Simons  (née Nash, 16 February 1912 – 13 September 1996) was a notable New Zealand sportswoman, sports journalist and writer. She was born in Greymouth, New Zealand, in 1912.

She was appointed an Officer of the Order of the British Empire, for services to youth and sport, in the 1974 New Year Honours.

References

1912 births
1996 deaths
New Zealand female field hockey players
Sportspeople from Greymouth
New Zealand women cricketers
New Zealand sports executives and administrators
People educated at Nelson College for Girls
New Zealand Officers of the Order of the British Empire
20th-century New Zealand journalists